Chengguan Subdistrict is a subdistrict on the eastern side of  Fangshan District, Beijing, China. It borders Yingfeng, XIngyang, Dongfeng Subdistricts to the north, Qinglonghu Town to the northeast, Yancun and Doudian Towns to the east, Shilou Town to the south, Yingfeng Subdistrict and Zhoukoudian Town to the west. Its total population was 121,242 as of 2020. 

The name Chengguan refers to the region's historical location near the city gate. Since a lot of places in China inherited their names from a time when city gates still existed, the name Chengguan appears in many of them, including Qingdao, Lanzhou, Lhasa, among others.

History

Administrative Divisions 
In the year 2021, Chengguan Subdistrict had 46 subdivisions, more specifically 24 communities and 22 villages:

See also 
 List of township-level divisions of Beijing

References 

Fangshan District
Subdistricts of Beijing